Salmon River State Forest is a Connecticut state forest located in the towns of Hebron, Marlborough, Colchester, East Haddam, and East Hampton. It includes  leased from the United States government. The forest features Comstock's Bridge, the only remaining covered bridge in eastern Connecticut, which spans the Salmon River near Route 16 in East Hampton.

Recreation opportunities

The forest's hiking trails include the  blue-blazed Salmon River Trail and a portion of the Airline State Park, a rail trail that features the -high Lyman Viaduct. Fishing opportunities include a handicap accessible fly fishing area and a disabled veterans fishing area. The forest also offers facilities for field sports, hunting, mountain biking, and picnicking.

References

External links
Salmon River State Forest Connecticut Department of Energy and Environmental Protection

Colchester, Connecticut
Connecticut state forests
Parks in Middlesex County, Connecticut
Parks in New London County, Connecticut
East Haddam, Connecticut
Protected areas established in 1934
1934 establishments in Connecticut